Welsh hip hop is a genre of Welsh music, and a culture that covers a variety of styles of hip hop music made in Wales.

History 
Goldie Lookin Chain was one of the first hip hop groups from Wales to chart. The group from Newport, founded in the early noughties to produce songs with "incendiary beats" and "flammable-looking trackie tops". The Cardiff-based hip hop label Associated Minds was founded in 2004, but it has generally been difficult for Welsh rappers to gain attention outside Wales.

In 2012 a bilingual rap artist, Mr Phormula, became the first artist to rap in Welsh at the MOBO awards.

In 2016, Astroid Boys, a Welsh rap rock band from Cardiff, emerged with a music style that has been called a mix of hardcore punk and grime music.

Resurgence of Welsh hip hop in the 2020s
By 2019, Astroid Boys were described as "undoubtedly leading the way for Welsh rap". MC Benji said “we play with a lot of different styles and ideas and don’t tend to conform to any set genre.”

In January 2022, Welsh rapper LEMFRECK was announced in the lineup for "In It Together", dubbed the "Welsh Glastonbury".

In May 2022 Dom James and Lloyd, two rap artists who rap in both Welsh and English, released the track "Pwy Sy'n Galw?" ("Who's Calling?").In the summer of 2022, Sage Todz (Toda Ogunbanwo) from Penygroes in Gwynedd, emerged as a bilingual talent. He released the first-ever Bilingual language drill track called "Rownd a Rownd" ("Round and Round") which gained popularity in Wales.  Sage Todz also released a single called "O HYD" ("Still"), sampling Dafydd Iwan's "Yma O Hyd" ("Still Here") anthemic hit. "O HYD" was played by the Football Association of Wales during Wales' 2022 FIFA World Cup campaign.

Scene 
Much of Welsh hip hop activity occurs in the capital city, Cardiff.

List of Welsh hip hop artists

Drill 

 Sage Todz

 Juice Menace

Grime 

 L E M F R E C K 
 Dom James and Lloyd
 Astroid Boys

Hip hop 

 Goldie Lookin Chain
 Mr Phormula
 Deyah
 Llwybr Llaethog

Dubstep 

 Mr Traumatik

References 

hip hop
British hip hop